Las Lajas is a corregimiento in Chame District, Panamá Oeste Province, Panama with a population of 3,431 as of 2010. Its population as of 1990 was 1,602; its population as of 2000 was 2,531.

References

Corregimientos of Panamá Oeste Province